Clarkia bottae is a species of wildflower with several common names, including punchbowl godetia, Botta's clarkia, Botta's fairyfan, and hill clarkia.

Description
Clarkia bottae produces spindly, waxy stems which may approach a meter in height, and sparse narrow leaves.

The flower is a bowl shaped bloom with lavender or pinkish-purple petals, often lighter in color toward the base and speckled with red, each 1 to 3 centimeters long. The stigma protrudes from the corolla and is surrounded by shorter stamens.

Distribution and habitat
Clarkia bottae is endemic to the mountains of southern California. It is found in chaparral and coastal scrub plant communities.

Cultivation
Cultivars include Lilac Pixie.

External links

Calflora: Clarkia bottae
Jepson Manual Profile
Photo gallery

bottae
Endemic flora of California
Natural history of the California chaparral and woodlands
Natural history of the California Coast Ranges
Natural history of the Peninsular Ranges
Natural history of the Santa Monica Mountains
Natural history of the Transverse Ranges
Plants described in 1835
Flora without expected TNC conservation status